The following is the standings of the Persian Gulf Cup's 2001–02 football season. This season will be the first season since the establishment of the Iran Pro League (Persian Gulf Cup). Persepolis became the first team to win Pro league under the management of Ali Parvin.

Final classification

Results table

Top goal scorers

17
  Reza Enayati (Aboomoslem)
11
  Ali Asghar Modirroosta (Paykan)
9
  Sohrab Entezari (Persepolis)
  Behnam Seraj (Foolad)
8
  Khodadad Azizi (PAS Tehran)
  Sirous Dinmohammadi (Esteghlal)
  Rasoul Khatibi (PAS Tehran)
  Reza Ostovari (Paykan)
  Mohammad Mansouri (Bargh Shiraz)

Participating in international competitions
2001–02 Asian Club Championship
Esteghlal
2001–02 Asian Cup Winners' Cup
Fajr Sepasi

References

Iran Premier League Statistics
Persian League

Iran Pro League seasons
Iran
1